Danny Boy is a 1941 British drama film directed by Oswald Mitchell and starring David Farrar, Wilfrid Lawson, Ann Todd, John Warwick, and Grant Tyler. Halliwell's Film and Video Guide describes the film as a "sentimental drama with music; not for the critical."

Cast
 David Farrar - Martin
 Wilfrid Lawson - Newton
 Ann Todd - Jane Kaye
 John Warwick - Carter
 Grant Tyler - Danny
 Wylie Watson - Fiddlesticks
 Tony Quinn - Maloney
 Nora Gordon - Mrs Maloney
 Pat Lennox - Manager
 Albert Whelan - Scotty
 Harry Herbert - Skinny

References

External links

1941 films
1941 drama films
Films directed by Oswald Mitchell
British drama films
British black-and-white films
Films scored by Percival Mackey
1940s English-language films
1940s British films